Senna corymbosa is an ornamental plant in the genus Senna.  It is also known as Argentine senna, Argentina senna, buttercup bush, flowering senna, Texas flowery senna or tree senna.

Description

This evergreen shrub reaches a height of about one meter. It can be grown in temperate climates as it is somewhat frost-hardy. The soil should be loamy and peaty. Argentine Senna may be propagated by cuttings planted in sand in warm and protected conditions (e.g. a glasshouse). In the Northern Hemisphere, it flowers in July.

Synonyms
Synonyms:
 Adipera corymbosa (Lam.) Britton & Rose
 Cassia corymbosa Lam.
 Cassia crassifolia Ortega
 Cassia falcata Dum. Cours.
Cassia falcata L. is a synonym of Senna occidentalis
 Chamaefistula corymbosa (Lam.) G.Don

Footnotes

References
  (2005): Genus Canavalia. Version 10.01, November 2005. Retrieved 2007-DEC-17.
  (1904): Gardening for the Million. Fisher Unwin, London. TXT and HTML fulltexts at Project Gutenberg.
  (2007): USDA Plants Profile: Senna corymbosa. Retrieved 2007-DEC20.

Garden plants
corymbosa

http://www.worldfloraonline.org/taxon/wfo-0000163689